Iyin-Ekiti is a town in Ekiti State, Nigeria, situated between Igede Ekiti  Ado Ekiti in the Southwestern part of Nigeria.  It is at an elevation of 457 m

The town was established between 1951 and 1954, when the Uyin people of the villages of Araromi, Okesale, Oketoro and Okelawe moved to the site, then sparsely occupied.
Iyin now has eight primary and three post primary Schools, a modern police station and barracks, a general post office, a local government maternity center and a general hospital.
The town also has a micro-finance bank.

Robert Adeyinka Adebayo, the former Governor of the now defunct Western State of Nigeria from 1966-1971 was born in Iyin in 1928.
The Late Oluyin of Iyin Ekiti, Oba Ademola Ajakaiye, was the pioneer chief judge of Ekiti State. General Hospital Iyin Ekiti was renamed General Adeyinka Adebayo General Hospital, Iyin Ekiti, this change was effected by Ekiti State Government to immortalize Late General Robert Adeyinka Adebayo who died on March 8, 2017 - a day to his 88th birthday.

Iyin Ekiti is the home to many prominent Nigerians among which are former Commissioner of Police (during the former military government regime of General Yakubu Gowon), Chief Hector Adeyeye Vincent Omooba, the former Minister for Aviation, Mr Babatunde Omotoba, Major Gen. Olawunmi; the former NYSC boss; Dr Eniola Ajayi, Nigerian ambassador to Hungary; the first executive governor of Ekiti State and a Minister of the Federal Republic of Nigeria, Otunba Niyi Adebayo; Jake Adebayo - founder of one of Africa's most successfully bootstrapped tech startups  and Senator Micheal Bamidele among others.

Its closeness to the state capital has helped economically. The new Iyin road is also expected to bring in development to the community owing to the fact that the boundary of Ado-Iyin on the axis is developing rapidly with Tungba Village, NCCF and the Ekiti State Housing Estate all in Iyin-Ekiti.

The town embraces Christianity and Islam without jeopardizing the traditional aspect. In the area of tourism, the town is blessed with ecotourism and cultural tourism sites e. g. Esa Cave, Akonoso bend, and various cultural festivals like Okudu Festival, Odun Opa.

Gallery

References

Populated places in Ekiti State
Towns in Yorubaland